Partial general elections were held in Belgium on 27 May 1906.
The result was a victory for the Catholic Party, which won 50 of the 85 seats in the Chamber of Representatives.

Under the alternating system, elections were only held in five out of the nine provinces: Antwerp, Brabant, Luxembourg, Namur and West Flanders.

The Catholic Party lost its majority in the Chamber of Representatives for the first time since 1884.

Results

References

Belgium
1900s elections in Belgium
Geenral
Belgium